Strigocossus elephas is a moth in the  family Cossidae. It is found in Malawi, South Africa (KwaZulu-Natal), Eswatini and Uganda.

References

Zeuzerinae